This is a list of women botanists.

See also 
 List of botanists
 Lists of women

References

External links
Women in Botany - Interactive database, containing biographical and bibliographical information on more than 10.000 women in all fields of botany

 
.
Botanists
Botanists
Botanists